is a 1952 Japanese historical fiction film directed by Kenji Mizoguchi from a screenplay by Yoshikata Yoda. It stars Kinuyo Tanaka as Oharu, a one-time concubine of a daimyō (and mother of a later daimyō) who struggles to escape the stigma of having been forced into prostitution by her father.

The Life of Oharu is based on various stories from Ihara Saikaku's 1686 work The Life of an Amorous Woman. The film was produced by the Shintoho Company and executive produced by Isamu Yoshiji, with cinematography by Yoshimi Hirano. The production designer was Hiroshi Mizutani and Isamu Yoshi was the historical consultant.

Plot

The story opens on Oharu as an old woman in a temple flashing back through the events of her life. It begins with her love affair with a page, Katsunosuke, the result of which (due to their class difference) is his execution and her family's banishment. Oharu attempts suicide but fails and is sold to be the mistress of Lord Matsudaira with the hope she will bear him a son. She does, but then is sent home with minimal compensation to the dismay of her father, who has worked up quite a debt in the meantime. He sends her to be a courtesan, but there, too, she fails and is again sent home.

Oharu goes to serve the family of a woman who must hide the fact that she is bald from her husband. The woman becomes jealous of Oharu and makes her chop off her hair, but Oharu retaliates, revealing the woman's secret. She again must leave—this time she marries a fan maker who is killed shortly after during a robbery. She attempts to become a nun, but Oharu is thrown out after being caught naked with a man seeking reimbursement for an unauthorized gift (it is made clear this is rape by Oharu's claims and distraught demeanor). She is thrown out of the temple, becomes a prostitute, but fails even at that. In the end, she is recalled to the Lord's house to be exiled within the compounds to keep her secrets locked away. While being scolded for the life she chose, she attempts to find her son, and in the process, ends up running away as she chooses the life of a wandering nun over the life in exile.

Cast 

 Kinuyo Tanaka as Oharu – the protagonist whose bad luck and misfortune lead to various struggles in life.
 Tsukie Matsuura as Tomo, Oharu's mother – a kind character in the film; her mother tended to side with Oharu and did not wish to see her become a courtesan.
 Ichirō Sugai as Shinzaemon, Oharu's father – Oharu's father was consumed by desire for money and social status. His misjudgments about Oharu caused much of her downfall.
 Toshiro Mifune as Katsunosuke – a page who courted Oharu and they fell into a forbidden love. He is beheaded once their relationship is discovered.
 Toshiaki Konoe as Lord Harutaka Matsudaira – he takes Oharu as a mistress in order to bear a child heir. Unfortunately for Oharu, he falls in love with Oharu and his wife's jealousy causes her dismissal.
 Hisako Yamane as Lady Matsudaira – the wife of Harutaka Matsudaira who, because of her jealousy of her husband's love for Oharu, banishes her.
 Jūkichi Uno as Yakichi Ogiya – he was a respected fan maker who married Oharu, however, he is tragically murdered shortly into their marriage.
 Kiyoko Tsuji as Landlady
 Eitarō Shindō as Kahe Sasaya
 Akira Oizumi as Fumikichi, Sasaya's friend.
 Kyoko Kusajima as Sodegaki
 Masao Shimizu as Kikuoji
 Daisuke Katō as Tasaburo Hishiya
 Toranosuke Ogawa as Yoshioka
 Hiroshi Oizumi as manager Bunkichi
 Haruyo Ichikawa as Lady-in-waiting Iwabashi
 Yuriko Hamada as Otsubone Yoshioka
 Noriko Sengoku as Lady-in-waiting Sakurai
 Sadako Sawamura as Owasa
 Masao Mishima as Taisaburo Hishiya
 Eijirō Yanagi as forger
 Chieko Higashiyama as Myokai, the old nun
 Takashi Shimura as old man
 Benkei Shiganoya as Jihei
 Komako Hara as Otsubone Kuzui

Awards
The Life of Oharu won the International Prize at the 1952 Venice International Film Festival and was nominated for the Golden Lion.  The film (as well as the 1952 films Himitsu, Inazuma, and Okaasan) won the 1953 Mainichi Film Concours award for best film score (Ichirō Saitō).

Reception 
The Japanese filmmaker Akira Kurosawa cited The Life of Oharu as one of his 100 favorite films.

References

External links

 
 
 
 Comparison of DVD and Blu-ray releases at DVDBeaver.com
The Life of Oharu: Not Reconciled an essay by Gilberto Perez at the Criterion Collection

1952 films
1952 drama films
Japanese black-and-white films
Films directed by Kenji Mizoguchi
1950s Japanese-language films
Jidaigeki films
Japanese drama films
Films about geisha
Films set in Kyoto
Films with screenplays by Yoshikata Yoda
Films scored by Ichirō Saitō
Films based on Japanese novels
Films about prostitution in Japan
Shintoho films
1950s Japanese films